The Association of Field Ornithologists (AFO) is an American ornithological society, with a strong focus on field studies and banding, priding itself as serving as a bridge between professional and amateur ornithologists.  It was founded in 1922 as the New England Bird Banding Association, then becoming the Northeastern Bird-Banding Association, before expanding its geographical scope and acquiring its current name.  It publishes a twice-yearly newsletter, AFO Afield, as well as the quarterly Journal of Field Ornithology.  The AFO is a member of the Ornithological Council.

Awards

Skutch Award
Officially named The Pamela and Alexander F. Skutch Research Award, the Skutch Award of up to US$10,000 is presented annually. Applications may be made in English, Spanish or Portuguese by 15 July for the following year.  Preference is given to those who propose field research from a Neotropical base.

The Skutch Award is named for Alexander Skutch.

Bergstrom Award
The Bergstrom Research Award is presented annually in honor of E. Alexander Bergstrom.

Journal

The AFO publishes the quarterly Journal of Field Ornithology. It was previously known as the Bulletin of the Northeastern Bird-Banding Association (1925–1929) and Bird-Banding (1930–1979).

See also

 List of ornithology awards

References

External links
 Association of Field Ornithologists

Ornithological organizations
1922 establishments in Massachusetts